Gavara  is one of the many small Indian communities or castes of Andhra who live mostly in the north coastal districts.

In common with many other communities, the Kavarai often use the title Naidu.

References

Social groups of Andhra Pradesh